{{DISPLAYTITLE:C15H24N2O}}
The molecular formula C15H24N2O (molar mass: 248.36 g/mol, exact mass: 248.1889 u) may refer to:

 Matrine
 Morforex, or N-morpholinoethylamphetamine
 Trimecaine

Molecular formulas